Vancouver Peninsula is a locality in Western Australia. The only residential structure on the Vancouver Peninsula is Camp Quaranup at Geake Point.

Vancouver Peninsula is part of the traditional settlement area of the Mineng Aboriginal people. The name refers to George Vancouver, a British officer, and explorer who was the first European to visit the bay in 1791. Originally, Vancouver Peninsula was part of Frenchman Bay in which was split from in 2000.

Demographics

References

External links 

Great Southern (Western Australia)